Bakke is a former municipality in Vest-Agder county, Norway. The  municipality  existed from 1838 until its dissolution in 1965. It was located in the present-day municipalities of Sirdal and Flekkefjord. It included the whole Sirdalen valley along the Rogaland county border, stretching from the Aust-Agder county border in the north to Sirnes and the lake Lundevatnet in the south.  The administrative center was the village of Sira where Bakke Church is located.

History
The church parish of Bakke (population: 2,378 in 1835) was split into three civil municipalities on 1 January 1838: Vestre Bakke, Østre Bakke, and Gyland. This occurred because the main church parish of Bakke contained land in both the counties of Stavanger and Lister og Mandal and they had to be divided according to the newly passed formannskapsdistrikt law. Due to the very low populations of the three municipalities, this arrangement did not last long. In August 1838, the county border was moved westwards to its current position, and Østre Bakke and Vestre Bakke were merged to form the municipality of Bakke. Then about a year later, in November 1839, Gyland was merged into the municipality of Bakke.

In 1849, the northern district of Sirdal (population: 1,804) was separated from Bakke to become a municipality of its own, leaving 2,597 inhabitants in Bakke.  On 31 December 1893, Gyland (population: 1,085) was also separated from Bakke to form a municipality of its own.  This split left Bakke with a population of 1,368.  On 1 January 1960, the Øksendal area (population: 226) in northern Bakke was merged with Tonstad and Øvre Sirdal municipalities to form a new municipality of Sirdal. 

On 1 January 1965, another major municipal merger took place due in part to the work of the Schei Committee.  Bakke (population: 925) was merged with the neighboring municipalities of Gyland, Nes, and Hidra and with the town of Flekkefjord to create the new municipality of Flekkefjord.

Name
The parish and the municipality was named after the old Bakke farm, located on the south side of the village of Sira, where the first Bakke Church was located.

Government
All municipalities in Norway, including Bakke, are responsible for primary education (through 10th grade), outpatient health services, senior citizen services, unemployment and other social services, zoning, economic development, and municipal roads.  The municipality was governed by a municipal council of elected representatives, which in turn elected a mayor.

Municipal council
The municipal council  of Bakke was made up of representatives that were elected to four year terms.  The party breakdown of the final municipal council was as follows:

See also
List of former municipalities of Norway

References

External links
Weather information for Bakke 

Sirdal
Former municipalities of Norway
1838 establishments in Norway
1965 disestablishments in Norway